Hauchiella is a genus of annelids belonging to the family Terebellidae.

The genus has almost cosmopolitan distribution.

Species:

Hauchiella renilla 
Hauchiella tentaculata 
Hauchiella tribullata

References

Annelids